Little Brokenstraw Creek is a  long 3rd order tributary to Brokenstraw Creek.  Little Brokenstraw Creek and its tributaries are classed as a cold water fisheries by the Pennsylvania Fish and Boat Commission.

Variant names
According to the Geographic Names Information System, it has also been known historically as:  
Cosh-not-e-a-go
Little Brocken Straw Creek
Little Broken Straw Creek

Course
Little Brokenstraw Creek rises on the French Creek divide about 2 miles northeast of Wickwire Corners, New York.  It then flows southeast into Pennsylvania to meet Brokenstraw Creek at Pittsfield, Pennsylvania.

Watershed
Little Brokenstraw Creek drains  of primarily the Venango Formation. The watershed receives an average of 43.1 in/year of precipitation and has a wetness index of 444.38.  The watershed is about 61% forested.

See also 
 List of rivers of Pennsylvania

References

Rivers of Pennsylvania
Rivers of New York (state)
Tributaries of the Allegheny River
Rivers of Warren County, Pennsylvania
Rivers of Chautauqua County, New York